The Des Vents Lake (French: Lac des Vents) is a freshwater body of the southeastern portion of Eeyou Istchee James Bay (municipality), in the North-West of Quebec, in the province of Quebec, in Canada. The area of "Lac des Vents" extends in the townships of Lescure, Druillettes, Rasles and Hazeur, on the territory of the Eeyou Istchee James Bay (municipality) regional government, south of Chapais, Quebec.

Forestry is the main economic activity of the sector. Recreational tourism activities come second, notably thanks to various navigable water bodies located in the area.

The hydrographic slope of "Lac des Vents" is accessible through the forest road (east-west) R1009 serving the south-eastern part of the lake, the strip of land separating the "Lake of the Winds" and the Caopatina Lake. This road climbs north passing east of Irene Lake and west of Obatogamau Lakes.

The surface of "Lac des Vents" is generally frozen from early November to mid-May, however, safe ice circulation is generally from mid-November to mid-April.

Geography

Toponymy
The toponym "lac des Vents" was made official on December 5, 1968 by the Commission de toponymie du Québec, at the time of its creation.

Notes and references

See also 

Eeyou Istchee James Bay
Lakes of Nord-du-Québec
Nottaway River drainage basin